The Masters Athletics Federation of India (MAFI)  is the body responsible for selecting masters athletes to represent India at the World Masters Games, Asia Masters Athletics Championships and other international Masters athletic meets and for managing the Indian teams at the events.

History
Each individual country governs its own affairs with an organizational governing body that is an affiliate to WMA. Masters Athletics Federation of India (MAFI) is affiliated with World Masters Athletics and Asia Masters Athletics. India has hosted the Asia Masters Athletics Championships three times.

See also
 Athletics Federation of India
 Sports Authority of India
 Indian Olympic Association
 Paralympic Committee of India

References

External links
 

Athletics organizations
Masters athletics (track and field)
Sports governing bodies in India
Athletics in India
National governing bodies for athletics
National members of the International Association of Athletics Federations